The Săcel oil field is an oil field located in Săcel, Maramureș County. It was discovered in 1990 and developed by Petrom but the company abandoned the project in 2007 when it was bought by Brent Oil. It began production in 1991 and produces oil.

References

Oil fields in Romania